Sri Vaikuntanatha Swamy Temple is a 500 year old Vaishnavite temple situated at Therani village in Chittoor District of Andhra Pradesh. The temple is dedicated to Lord Vishnu who is referred to as Vaikuntanatha. The temples was constructed during 16th Century on the banks of river Kushasthali. The temple is 5 km away from Nagari town and 50 km away from Tirupati city.

History 
The temple was built during 16th Century by Sudarsanachary, a pundit in the royal court of the Karvetinagaram which was a part of Vijayanagara Empire. The temple was most neglected and turned into a ramshackle structure over a period of time. The temple had undergone recent renovation works with donations from a devotee.

Presiding Deities
The temple is dedicated to Lord Vishnu referred to as Vaikuntanatha Swamy. The garbhagriha hosts deities of Vaikuntanatha swamy along with Sridevi and Bhudevi on either side.

See also
Therani
Hindu Temples in Tirupati

References

Hindu temples in Chittoor district
Vishnu temples
16th-century Hindu temples